The Ministers responsible for the Ministry of Health and Family Welfare in the Government of Bihar, India have been:

References

 Bihar Health Minister: Latest News, Photos, Videos on Bihar Health Minister

Government of Bihar
Lists of government ministers of Bihar